Philip of Jesus is a 1949 Mexican historical drama film directed by Julio Bracho and starring Ernesto Alonso, Rita Macedo and Julio Villarreal. It portrays the life of the Mexican priest Philip of Jesus who was martyred in Japan in 1597.

Cast

References

Bibliography 
 Rogelio Agrasánchez. Cine Mexicano: Posters from the Golden Age, 1936-1956. Chronicle Books, 2001.

External links 
 

1949 films
1940s historical drama films
Mexican historical drama films
1940s Spanish-language films
Films directed by Julio Bracho
Films set in Japan
Films set in the 16th century
Mexican black-and-white films
1949 drama films
26 Martyrs of Japan
1940s Mexican films